William J. Laimbeer Jr. (born May 19, 1957) is an American professional basketball coach and former player who spent the majority of his career with the Detroit Pistons. Known for his rough and violent style of play, he played a big part in the Pistons earning the nickname, the “Bad Boys" in the mid 1980s before helping them win back to back NBA championships.

In his National Basketball Association (NBA) career, Laimbeer was known for his 11-year tenure with the Detroit Pistons during their "Bad Boys" era. Although a solid shooter and rebounder, Laimbeer became notorious for his physical play and reputation for delivering hard, often flagrant fouls. Laimbeer played at center with Hall of Fame backcourt guards Isiah Thomas and Joe Dumars and forward Dennis Rodman, winning back to back NBA Championships in 1989 and 1990 with the Pistons, and being named an NBA All-Star four times. Prior to the NBA, he played for the University of Notre Dame and Palos Verdes High School in Southern California.

After his playing career, Laimbeer served as the head coach and general manager of the Detroit Shock in the WNBA from 2002 to 2009, coaching the team to three league championships in 2003, 2006, and 2008. He was the head coach of the New York Liberty from 2013 to 2017 and the head coach of the Las Vegas Aces from 2018 until 2021. He has twice been named the WNBA's Coach of the Year.

Early life

Laimbeer was born in Boston and raised in the Chicago suburb of Clarendon Hills before moving with his family to Palos Verdes Estates, California. His father, William Laimbeer Sr., was an Owens-Illinois executive who rose as high as company president. The younger Laimbeer once famously joked, "I'm the only player in the NBA who makes less money than his father."

Laimbeer played a Sleestak on the children's TV series Land of the Lost before attending Notre Dame. He was a Palos Verdes High School student, and the Land of the Lost show solicited their basketball team for tall people to play Sleestaks.

College career 
For college, Laimbeer attended Notre Dame where he played basketball, but he flunked out after his freshman year. To regain his eligibility, he spent two semesters at Owens Technical College in Toledo, Ohio. Laimbeer then re-entered Notre Dame. He spent two years playing for Notre Dame's basketball team. For his last two years of college, he averaged 7.3 points and 6.0 rebounds per game while playing 20 minutes a game, primarily as a substitute. With the Fighting Irish, Laimbeer appeared in the Final Four of the NCAA Tournament in 1978, and the Elite Eight in 1979.

Professional career

Brescia (1979–1980) 
Laimbeer was drafted by the Cleveland Cavaliers in 1979, but spent his first professional season in Europe. He played in Italy for Pinti Inox Brescia, where he averaged 21.1 points and 12.5 rebounds.

Cleveland Cavaliers (1980–1982) 
Laimbeer returned to play for the Cavaliers in 1980. He was a reserve for the entire 1980-81 season and started only 4 games for the 1981–82 team.

Detroit Pistons (1982–1993) 
On February 16, 1982, Laimbeer was traded to the Detroit Pistons, where he remained for the rest of his career. He was immediately installed as the Pistons starting center. During his playing career, Laimbeer was one of the most notorious players in the NBA. While highly popular among Piston fans, Laimbeer was despised by opposing players and fans for his disdain of his opponents, his poor sportsmanship, and his dangerous play, such as repeatedly committing violent intentional fouls. In the public eye, Laimbeer's reputation for physical play tended to overshadow his skills. His former teammate Dennis Rodman noted this in his book Bad As I Wanna Be, saying, "[Laimbeer] was more than a thug, but that's what he'll be remembered for." In an interview for the 1990 NBA Home Video release "Pure Pistons," teammate Isiah Thomas also talked about Laimbeer's effect on opposing players, saying, "He frustrates people," but then added, "He frustrates people...because he's good." 

In the ESPN 30 for 30 film Bad Boys, Laimbeer said his approach to the game was all psychological. When the Pistons would take to the court before a game, Laimbeer made it a point to lead the rest of the team out from the locker room and he always did so with a scowl on his face to show he was not intimidated by anyone. 

While a serviceable and solid player for most of his career, Laimbeer knew there were better skilled players than him. However, there were not as many players who were as physical on the court as he was, and Laimbeer was able to use that to his advantage. The hard-nosed approach he used was designed to wear on opposing players to the point where they began focusing more on retaliating against him and the rest of the Pistons instead of trying to win the game; Laimbeer said if he was able to do that to an opponent during the course of a game, he had broken them down. He even said the local media would play a role as his and the team's reputation preceded them: "When the Pistons came into a town, all the media would write about were the 'Bad Boys' and how rough we played. They'd be asking players if they were going to stand up to us. And once we got teams thinking like that, we had them. We already got them out of their game."

Laimbeer was one of the top outside-shooting centers of his era, draining over 200 three-pointers for his career, and excelled at running the pick and pop with guards Isiah Thomas and Joe Dumars. Then-head coach Chuck Daly utilized Laimbeer's inside-outside skills to great effect. On the defensive end, Laimbeer was one of the best rebounders in the game. On the offensive end, Daly would often have Laimbeer fade to the perimeter rather than roll to the basket, which had the additional effect of keeping the opposing team's best rebounder far from the backboard. Laimbeer was selected to the NBA All-Star Game on four occasions (1983, 1984, 1985 and 1987) and finished among the league leaders in rebounding and free throw percentage several times, winning the rebound title in the 1985–86 season. Laimbeer started on the Pistons' 1989 and 1990 NBA championship teams.

Laimbeer spent 14 seasons in the NBA, mostly with the Detroit Pistons. Laimbeer became the 19th player in league history to amass more than 10,000 points and 10,000 rebounds. Laimbeer was most effective off the defensive glass – from 1982 to 1990 no player in the league totaled more defensive rebounds. He was also remarkably durable, never playing fewer than 79 regular-season games during his first 13 seasons, and playing all 82 games seven times. His streak of 685 consecutive games played (which ended due to suspension in the 1988–89 season) is the fifth longest in league history. Laimbeer retired early in the 1993–94 season at age 36 after an incident in practice with longtime friend Isiah Thomas that led to Thomas breaking his hand. Laimbeer, upset over the fight as well as worried over the reaction of Pistons fans for injuring their team captain, decided to retire, believing the fight with Isiah was his "downfall". He announced his retirement after a meeting with Thomas and head coach Don Chaney that ended with him and Thomas teary-eyed and remaining best friends. Laimbeer had his jersey number (40) retired by the Pistons in February 1995. He remains the franchise's all-time leader in career rebounds.

Laimbeer endorsed a video game for the Super Nintendo Entertainment System, Bill Laimbeer's Combat Basketball, a futuristic basketball game in which physical play is encouraged. In a cameo in the ninth season of Cheers, Kevin McHale of the rival Celtics remarked, when presented with the X-Ray of an adult male gorilla's ankle, "...could be Laimbeer."

Career statistics

Regular season

|-
| style="text-align:left;"|
| style="text-align:left;"|Cleveland
| 81 || — || 30.4 || .503 ||  || .765 || 8.6 || 2.7 || .7 || 1.0 || 9.8
|-
| style="text-align:left;"|
| style="text-align:left;"|Cleveland
| 50 || 4 || 17.9 || .470 || .500 || .775 || 5.5 || .9 || .4 || .6 || 6.7
|-
| style="text-align:left;"|
| style="text-align:left;"|Detroit
| 30 || 30 || 31.2 || .516 || .143 || .813 || 11.3 || 1.8 || .6 || 1.1 || 12.8
|-
| style="text-align:left;"|
| style="text-align:left;"|Detroit
| 82 || 82 || 35.0 || .497 || .154 || .790 || 12.1 || 3.2 || .6 || 1.4 || 13.6
|-
| style="text-align:left;"|
| style="text-align:left;"|Detroit
| 82 || 82 || 34.9 || .530 || .000 || .866 || 12.2 || 1.8 || .6 || 1.0 || 17.3
|-
| style="text-align:left;"|
| style="text-align:left;"|Detroit
| 82 || 82 || 35.3 || .506 || .222 || .797 || 12.4 || 1.9 || .8 || .9 || 17.5
|-
| style="text-align:left;"|
| style="text-align:left;"|Detroit
| 82 || 82 || 35.3 || .492 || .286 || .834 ||style="background:#cfecec;"| 13.1* || 1.8 || .7 || .8 || 16.6
|-
| style="text-align:left;"|
| style="text-align:left;"|Detroit
| 82 || 82 || 34.8 || .501 || .286 || .894 || 11.6 || 1.8 || .9 || .8 || 15.4
|-
| style="text-align:left;"|
| style="text-align:left;"|Detroit
| 82 || 82 || 35.3 || .493 || .333 || .874 || 10.1 || 2.4 || .8 || 1.0 || 13.5
|-
| style="text-align:left; background:#afe6ba;"|†
| style="text-align:left;"|Detroit
| 81 || 81 || 32.6 || .499 || .349 || .840 || 9.6 || 2.2 || .6 || 1.2 || 13.7
|-
| style="text-align:left; background:#afe6ba;"|†
| style="text-align:left;"|Detroit
| 81 || 81 || 33.0 || .484 || .361 || .854 || 9.6 || 2.1 || .7 || 1.0 || 12.1
|-
| style="text-align:left;"|
| style="text-align:left;"|Detroit
| 82 || 81 || 32.5 || .478 || .296 || .837 || 9.0 || 1.9 || .5 || .7 || 11.0
|-
| style="text-align:left;"|
| style="text-align:left;"|Detroit
| 81 || 46 || 27.6 || .470 || .376 || .893 || 5.6 || 2.0 || .6 || .7 || 9.7
|-
| style="text-align:left;"|
| style="text-align:left;"|Detroit
| 79 || 41 || 24.5 || .509 || .370 || .894 || 5.3 || 1.6 || .6 || .5 || 8.7
|-
| style="text-align:left;"|
| style="text-align:left;"|Detroit
| 11 || 5 || 22.5 || .522 || .333 || .846 || 5.1 || 1.3 || .5 || .4 || 9.9
|- class="sortbottom"
| style="text-align:center;" colspan="2"|Career
| 1,068 || 861 || 31.8 || .498 || .326 || .837 || 9.7 || 2.0 || .7 || .9 || 12.9
|- class="sortbottom"
| style="text-align:center;" colspan="2"|All-Star
| 4 || 0 || 11.3 || .650 ||  || .667 || 2.8 || .5 || .5 || .5 || 7.0

Playoffs

|-
| style="text-align:left;"|1984
| style="text-align:left;"|Detroit
| 5 || 0 || 33.0 || .569 ||  || .900 || 12.4 || 2.4 || .8 || .6 || 15.2
|-
| style="text-align:left;"|1985
| style="text-align:left;"|Detroit
| 9 || 9 || 36.1 || .449 || .000 || .706 || 10.7 || 1.7 || .8 || .8 || 14.7
|-
| style="text-align:left;"|1986
| style="text-align:left;"|Detroit
| 4 || 4 || 42.0 || .500 || 1.000 || .913 || 14.0 || .3 || .5 || .8 || 22.5
|-
| style="text-align:left;"|1987
| style="text-align:left;"|Detroit
| 15 || 15 || 36.2 || .515 || .200 || .625 || 10.4 || 2.5 || 1.0 || .8 || 12.3
|-
| style="text-align:left;"|1988
| style="text-align:left;"|Detroit
| 23 || 23 || 33.9 || .456 || .294 || .889 || 9.6 || 1.9 || .8 || .8 || 11.9
|-
| style="text-align:left;background:#afe6ba;"|1989†
| style="text-align:left;"|Detroit
| 17 || 17 || 29.2 || .465 || .357 || .806 || 8.2 || 1.8 || .4 || .5 || 10.1
|-
| style="text-align:left;background:#afe6ba;"|1990†
| style="text-align:left;"|Detroit
| 20 || 20 || 33.4 || .457 || .349 || .862 || 10.6 || 1.4 || 1.2 || .9 || 11.1
|-
| style="text-align:left;"|1991
| style="text-align:left;"|Detroit
| 15 || 15 || 29.7 || .446 || .294 || .871 || 8.1 || 1.3 || .3 || .8 || 10.9
|-
| style="text-align:left;"|1992
| style="text-align:left;"|Detroit
| 5 || 4 || 29.0 || .370 || .200 || 1.000 || 6.6 || 1.6 || .8 || .2 || 8.2
|- class="sortbottom"
| style="text-align:center;" colspan="2"|Career
| 113 || 107 || 33.1 || .468 || .321 || .819 || 9.7 || 1.7 || .7 || .7 || 12.0

Post-playing life
In 1994, Laimbeer and his father William Sr. co-founded Laimbeer Packaging Corp., a company located in Melvindale, Michigan, a Detroit suburb, producing corrugated cardboard boxes. The company struggled through the late 1990s and closed in early 2002. 
Laimbeer won the NBA Shooting Stars Competition at the 2007 All-Star Weekend in Las Vegas along with Chauncey Billups of the Detroit Pistons and Swin Cash of the Detroit Shock. In February 2009 he won the competition with Arron Afflalo and Katie Smith. In 1999, Laimbeer was inducted into the Michigan Sports Hall of Fame.

Laimbeer is a former color commentator for the Pistons and was a studio analyst for ESPN in 2003.

Coaching career

Detroit Shock (2002–2009) 
In the middle of the 2002 WNBA season, Laimbeer took over the head coaching position for the Detroit Shock. A year later, he led the franchise to its first WNBA championship and was named Coach of the Year that year. It marked the first time in WNBA history that a team other than Los Angeles or Houston won the title. On September 9, 2006, Laimbeer led the Shock to their second WNBA championship against the Sacramento Monarchs in five games. Two years later, on October 5, 2008, Laimbeer led the team to its third league championship in six years by defeating San Antonio.

Laimbeer has talked about the possibility of one day coaching in the NBA. The New York Knicks' former team president, former Piston teammate Isiah Thomas, once considered Laimbeer as a possibility. The Pistons, presided by former teammate Joe Dumars, had considered the possibility of Laimbeer replacing departing coach Larry Brown, before ultimately hiring former Minnesota Timberwolves head coach Flip Saunders.

On June 15, 2009, Laimbeer resigned as head coach of the Detroit Shock, due to family reasons and the desire to become an NBA head coach.

Minnesota Timberwolves (2009–2012) 
Though he was unable to secure an NBA head coaching position, that same year Laimbeer was offered, and accepted, an assistant coach position with the Minnesota Timberwolves.

New York Liberty (2012–2017) 
In 2012, Laimbeer returned to the WNBA to become the head coach and general manager of the New York Liberty, replacing John Whisenant. He quickly returned to his pugnacious ways, drawing a fine for saying Minnesota Lynx player Maya Moore "should get hurt" for playing late into a game in which the Lynx easily defeated the Liberty.

On October 14, 2014, the Liberty parted ways with Laimbeer after two seasons, but he was rehired as the Liberty head coach on January 8, 2015.

Las Vegas Aces (2018–2021) 
On October 17, 2017, the then-unnamed Las Vegas Aces announced Laimbeer as head coach and President of Basketball Operations. Laimbeer coached the Aces through 2021. After the 2021 season Laimbeer retired from coaching

Coaching record

|-
| style="text-align:left;"|DES
| style="text-align:left;"|2002
| 22||9||13|||| style="text-align:center;"|8th in Eastern||—||—||—||—
| style="text-align:center;"|Missed playoffs
|- style="background:#FDE910;"
| style="text-align:left;"|DES
| style="text-align:left;"|2003
| 34||25||9|||| style="text-align:center;"|1st in Eastern||8||6||2||
| style="text-align:center;"|Won WNBA Championship
|- 
| style="text-align:left;"|DES
| style="text-align:left;"|2004
| 34||17||17|||| style="text-align:center;"|3rd in Eastern||3||1||2||
| style="text-align:center;"|Lost in Conference Semifinals
|- 
| style="text-align:left;"|DES
| style="text-align:left;"|2005
| 34||16||18|||| style="text-align:center;"|4th in Eastern||2||0||2||
| style="text-align:center;"|Lost in Conference Semifinals
|- style="background:#FDE910;"
| style="text-align:left;"|DES
| style="text-align:left;"|2006
| 34||23||11|||| style="text-align:center;"|2nd in Eastern||10||7||3||
| style="text-align:center;"|Won WNBA Championship
|-
| style="text-align:left;"|DES
| style="text-align:left;"|2007
| 34||24||10|||| style="text-align:center;"|1st in Eastern||11||6||5||
| style="text-align:center;"|Lost in WNBA Finals
|- style="background:#FDE910;"
| style="text-align:left;"|DES
| style="text-align:left;"|2008
| 34||22||12|||| style="text-align:center;"|1st in Eastern||9||7||2||
| style="text-align:center;"|Won WNBA Championship
|- 
| style="text-align:left;"|DES
| style="text-align:left;"|2009
| 4||1||3|||| style="text-align:center;"|(resigned)||—||—||—||—
| style="text-align:center;"|
|-
| style="text-align:left;"|NYL
| style="text-align:left;"|2013
| 34||11||23|||| style="text-align:center;"|5th in Eastern||—||—||—||—
| style="text-align:center;"|Missed playoffs
|-
| style="text-align:left;"|NYL
| style="text-align:left;"|2014
| 34||15||19|||| style="text-align:center;"|5th in Eastern||—||—||—||—
| style="text-align:center;"|Missed playoffs
|-
| style="text-align:left;"|NYL
| style="text-align:left;"|2015
| 34||23||11|||| style="text-align:center;"|1st in Eastern||5||3||2||
| style="text-align:center;"|Lost in Conference Finals
|-
| style="text-align:left;"|NYL
| style="text-align:left;"|2016
| 34||21||13|||| style="text-align:center;"|1st in Eastern||1||0||1||
| style="text-align:center;"|Lost in Second Round
|-
| style="text-align:left;"|NYL
| style="text-align:left;"|2017
| 34||22||12|||| style="text-align:center;"|1st in Eastern||1||0||1||
| style="text-align:center;"|Lost in Second Round
|-
| style="text-align:left;"|LVA
| style="text-align:left;"|2018
| 34||14||20|||| style="text-align:center;"|6th in Western||—||—||—||—
| style="text-align:center;"|Missed playoffs
|-
| style="text-align:left;"|LVA
| style="text-align:left;"|2019
| 34||21||13|||| style="text-align:center;"|2nd in Western||5||2||3||
| style="text-align:center;"|Lost in Conference Finals
|-
| style="text-align:left;"|LVA
| style="text-align:left;"|2020
| 22||18||4|||| style="text-align:center;"|1st in Western||8||3||5||
| style="text-align:center;"|Lost in WNBA Finals
|-
| style="text-align:left;" | LVA
| style="text-align:left;" | 2021
| 32 || 24 || 8 || || style="text-align:center;" | 1st in Western || 5 || 2 || 3 || 
| style="text-align:center;"| Lost in Conference Finals
|- class="sortbottom"
| style="text-align:center;" colspan="2"|Career
| 521 || 306 || 215 ||  ||   || 68 || 37 || 31 || ||

See also
 List of National Basketball Association career rebounding leaders
List of National Basketball Association season rebounding leaders

References

External links

 WNBA.com coach profile

1957 births
Living people
American agnostics
American expatriate basketball people in Italy
American male television actors
American men's basketball players
American women's basketball coaches
Basketball coaches from California
Basketball coaches from Illinois
Basketball coaches from Massachusetts
Basketball players from California
Basketball players from Illinois
Basketball players from Boston
Centers (basketball)
Cleveland Cavaliers draft picks
Cleveland Cavaliers players
Detroit Pistons announcers
Detroit Pistons players
Detroit Shock head coaches
Las Vegas Aces coaches
Minnesota Timberwolves assistant coaches
National Basketball Association All-Stars
National Basketball Association players with retired numbers
New York Liberty head coaches
Notre Dame Fighting Irish men's basketball players
Parade High School All-Americans (boys' basketball)
People from Clarendon Hills, Illinois
People from Palos Verdes, California
Sportspeople from Boston
Sportspeople from DuPage County, Illinois
Sportspeople from Los Angeles County, California
Women's National Basketball Association championship-winning head coaches
Women's National Basketball Association general managers